William Poul Jens Chievitz (1 January 1889 – 28 February 1965) was a Danish gymnast who competed in the 1908 Summer Olympics. In 1908 he finished fourth with the Danish team in the team competition.

References

External links
 

1889 births
1965 deaths
Danish male artistic gymnasts
Olympic gymnasts of Denmark
Gymnasts at the 1908 Summer Olympics